Plesiadapoidea was an extinct superfamily of primates that existed during the Paleocene and Eocene in North America, Europe, and Asia.

References

Plesiadapiformes
Paleocene mammals
Eocene mammals
Paleocene first appearances